The Church of the Good Shepherd in Phillipstown, Christchurch, New Zealand was the oldest and last surviving brick church designed by architect Benjamin Mountfort (1825–1898). It was registered as a "Historic Place – Category I" by the New Zealand Historic Places Trust.

History

The vicar of Phillipstown, Rev Hannibal James Congdon Gilbert, teamed up with an accountant (James Bowlker) and a storeman (Lewis Aylwin Carrell) to purchase the land for the church for £380 in September 1881. They onsold the Church Property Trustees for a nominal ten shillings in March 1883. The church, constructed in 1885, was designed in the Gothic Revival style with red brick with contrasting bands of stone, reflecting contemporary English architectural style A similarly detailed but larger church, St Johns Cathedral, was designed by Mountfort and built in Napier between 1886 and 1888. This was destroyed by the 1931 Hawke's Bay earthquake and thus left the Church of the Good Shepherd as Mounfort's only surviving brick church.

Mountfort's son Cyril oversaw the extension of the church in 1906/07.

During an earthquake in September 2010, the church suffered slight damage to its gables. Later that month, the church suffered significant damage to its interior due to vandalism. Major structural damage was caused the following February during the 2011 Christchurch earthquake. It was added to the list of demolitions by the Canterbury Earthquake Recovery Authority later that year and has since been demolished.

Heritage listing
On 2 April 1985, the church was registered by the New Zealand Historic Places Trust as a Category I historic place, with the registration number being 1855. It was significant as it was Mountfort's only surviving brick church.

References

Gothic Revival church buildings in New Zealand
Churches in Christchurch
Anglican churches in New Zealand
Heritage New Zealand Category 1 historic places in Canterbury, New Zealand
Churches completed in 1885
19th-century Anglican church buildings
Buildings and structures demolished as a result of the 2011 Christchurch earthquake
Former churches in New Zealand
Benjamin Mountfort church buildings
Listed churches in New Zealand
Phillipstown, New Zealand
1880s architecture in New Zealand